Andrea McArdle is an American singer and actress best known for originating the role of Annie in the Broadway musical Annie.

Career
McArdle was born in Philadelphia. While studying dance as a child, she was spotted by a talent agent who got her work in a number of television commercials, which led to her two-and-a-half year stint on the soap opera Search for Tomorrow. She also appeared on Al Alberts Showcase, a local televised talent show in Philadelphia.

McArdle's break came in early 1977 when she was pulled from the chorus of orphans to replace Kristen Vigard, the original Annie in the Broadway musical Annie, during the show's Connecticut tryout run. The show was a critical and commercial smash, and she became the youngest performer ever to be nominated for a Tony Award as Best Lead Actress in a Musical. McArdle lost to co-star Dorothy Loudon—who played Miss Hannigan—but did receive the Theater World and Outer Critics' Circle Awards for her performance. In April 1978, she opened in London's West End production. She appeared several times on The Tonight Show Starring Johnny Carson in 1977-79, on one occasion accompanied by Liberace. She also appeared more than once on the Mike Douglas Show, singing with Kristy McNichol, Stephanie Mills, Liberace and Don Rickles.  She appeared on Perry Como's Christmas show, where she sang with Como, and on Welcome Back Kotter, playing Arnold Horshack's younger sister.

In 1979, she sang the national anthems for both the United States and Canada at the Major League Baseball All Star Game in Seattle, Washington.  She also sang the American national anthem at Veterans Stadium in Philadelphia for the fifth and final game of the 1983 World Series, in her capacity as a native of Philadelphia.

Her first role after returning to the States was the role of Judy Garland in NBC's telepic Rainbow, but throughout her career she has concentrated primarily on performing in musical theater and cabarets. Her credits include Les Misérables (both on Broadway and in the national tour), Jerry's Girls (a revue of Jerry Herman songs co-starring Carol Channing and Leslie Uggams), Beauty and the Beast, Starlight Express, Meet Me In St. Louis, The Wizard of Oz, They're Playing Our Song, and another celebrated Annie in Irving Berlin's classic, Annie Get Your Gun. She briefly appeared in the 1999 Rob Marshall-directed TV version of Annie, singing the "Star To Be"  segment of the song "N.Y.C."

McArdle has performed in the showrooms of many of the casino hotels in Las Vegas and Atlantic City, and in cabarets such as Odette's in New Hope, Pennsylvania and the King Cole Room at the St. Regis Hotel and Freddy's Supper Club in Manhattan. McArdle once again starred in the musical Annie with the North Carolina Theatre Company, although she portrayed the role of Miss Hannigan, at odds with her former character.

Her CD, Andrea McArdle on Broadway, was arranged and produced by her ex-husband, composer Edd Kalehoff, who also collaborated with her on an album of Christmas songs that was released in conjunction with her Family Christmas Show at the Tropicana Hotel & Casino in Atlantic City, New Jersey. The Christmas show, "Andrea McArdle's Family Christmas" ran for three Christmases and featured dancers, singers and acrobats from Encore Productions in South Jersey. McArdle also sang and appeared in several television promotional campaigns produced by Kalehoff, including WNBC-TV's We're 4 New York in 1992, and WEWS-TV's Give Me 5 in 1995. Divorced in August 2011, the couple had one daughter, Alexis Kalehoff (b.1988), a performer who has appeared with her mother in Les Miz.

McArdle returned to Annie at Musical Theatre West in Long Beach, California, as Miss Hannigan from October 29 - November 14, 2010.  She took part in the New York Musical Theatre Festival's (NYMF) production of Greenwood the Musical in fall 2011 along with her daughter Alexis Kalehoff and fellow Annie alumna Alicia Morton.

In November 2012, McArdle was the "guest star" in Newsical.

On April 2, 2014 Oceania Cruises announced a new "Life in the Theater" series featuring McArdle, for select sailings starting with a voyage aboard Riviera on October 29, 2014.

In December 2015, McArdle starred in the Off-Broadway play 2 Across at St. Luke's Theatre along with Kip Gilman.

In May 2016, McArdle starred as Reno Sweeney in Cole Porter's Anything Goes. The show also featured Sally Struthers. The production opened at Gateway Playhouse (Bellport, New York), and later transferred to Ogunquit Playhouse. The production was directed by Jayme McDaniel, and choreographed by Jason Wise.

In November 2021, it was announced that McArdle would be playing Eleanor Roosevelt in NBC's Annie Live!, but she later had to drop out due to a family emergency and her character was not recast.

Personal life
Andrea was married to composer Edd Kalehoff from 1988 until they divorced in 2011. She has a daughter, Alexis Kalehoff, who has appeared in many Broadway theatre productions.

Stage work

Film and Television

Awards and honors 
1977 - Theatre World Award - winner
1977 - Tony Award - Outstanding Lead Actress in a Musical - nominee

References

External links

Biography and career at filmreference.com

Living people
American musical theatre actresses
Actresses from New Rochelle, New York
21st-century American women
Year of birth missing (living people)